Kasisi  Agricultural Training Centre (KATC) was founded by the Jesuits of the Zambia-Malawi Province in 1974 near Lusaka, Zambia. Since 1990 it has trained farmers in sustainable organic agriculture while carrying on research, extension, and lobbying efforts. It has its own farm to defray expenses.

See also
 List of Jesuit sites

References  

Educational organisations based in Zambia
Educational institutions established in 1974
Jesuit development centres
1974 establishments in Zambia